Six Triple Eight is an upcoming American war drama film written and directed by Tyler Perry, based on a 2019 WWII History magazine article by Kevin M. Hymel.

Premise
Showcases the contributions of the 6888th Central Postal Directory Battalion, an all-black and all-female battalion, in World War II.

Cast
 Kerry Washington as Major Charity Adams 
 Sam Waterston
 Susan Sarandon
 Oprah Winfrey
 Ebony Obsidian
 Milauna Jackson
 Kylie Jefferson
 Shanice Shantay
 Sarah Jeffery
 Pepi Sonuga
 Jay Reeves
 Jeanté Godlock
 Moriah Brown
 Baadja-Lyne Odums
 Gregg Sulkin
 Dean Norris

Production
It was announced in December 2022 that Tyler Perry would be writing and directing the film at Netflix. The film is based on historian Kevin M. Hymel's article "WAC Corporal Lena Derriecott and the 6888th Central Postal Battalion", published in the February 2019 issue of WWII History magazine. In January 2023, the cast, including Kerry Washington, Sam Waterston, Susan Sarandon and Oprah Winfrey was announced, with Washington also joining as an executive producer.

Filming began on January 17, 2023, in Atlanta. Production will also occur in Little Germany, Bradford in February.

References

External links

Upcoming films
African-American drama films
African-American war films
American films based on actual events
American war drama films
American World War II films
Drama films based on actual events
Films about the United States Army
Films based on newspaper and magazine articles
Films directed by Tyler Perry
Films scored by Aaron Zigman
Films shot in Atlanta
Films shot in Bradford
Films with screenplays by Tyler Perry
Mandalay Pictures films
Upcoming English-language films
Upcoming Netflix original films
Women's Army Corps
World War II films based on actual events